Vice Admiral Paul Murray  is a retired South African Navy officer who served as Chief of Staff Finance for the South African Defence Force before his retirement in 1993.

Naval career 
He was promoted to vice admiral in 1990.

He was promoted to rear admiral on 1 January 1989 and appointed Chief Director:Finances at SADF Headquarters.

Awards and decorations 
He was awarded the Star of South Africa, Silver in the 1994 National Honours.

References

South African admirals
Living people
Year of birth missing (living people)